Casoria Contemporary Art Museum is located in Casoria in the Province of Naples, Italy. In 2003 the comune approached Antonio Manfredi, a local artist and advocate of international contemporary art, as part of an initiative of local revitalization under the banner Una città per l'arte. The museum was founded in 2005 and has an exhibition space of 3,500 m2, largely devoted to its permanent collection of some thousand works by international artists. In April 2012 the museum began burning its collection in protest at the impact of austerity measures introduced in response to the nation's debt crisis, which have had a particularly adverse effect on arts funding.

See also
 Iconoclasm

References

External links
  Casoria Contemporary Art Museum
  Casoria Contemporary Art Museum

Museums in Campania
Modern art museums in Italy
Art museums and galleries in Campania
Museums established in 2005
2005 establishments in Italy
Contemporary art galleries in Italy